BCA may refer to:

Commerce
Bangladesh Caterers Association UK
Bank Central Asia, a private bank in Indonesia
Boeing Commercial Airplanes
Book Club Associates
British Car Auctions
Broadcasting Company of America, former American Telephone & Telegraph Company subsidiary
Broadcast Company of the Americas, former American company in San Diego, California
Business Council of Australia
Civilian Board of Contract Appeals, a United States government agency
Model Business Corporation Act
Broadcasting Corporation of Abia State

Education
Bachelor of Computer Application
Bergen County Academies, a magnet high school in New Jersey, United States
Botswana College of Agriculture
Brethren Colleges Abroad

Sports
Badminton Confederation of Africa, African badminton organisation
Barbados Cricket Association
Billiard Congress of America
Bihar Cricket Association
Black Coaches & Administrators, a U.S. organization supporting African American and other minority sports coaches and administrators 
British Caving Association
British Cheerleading Association
British Chess Association, replaced by the British Chess Federation in 1904
BC Augsburg, a defunct German association football club
BC Aichach, a German association football club

Science
Bicinchoninic acid
Bicinchoninic acid assay
Branched-chain amino acid
Binary collision approximation

Other uses
British Citizen Awards, a UK award for individuals doing extraordinary work in their community
Boston Center for the Arts
Breast cancer awareness
British Cartoonists' Association
British Central Africa
British Chiropractic Association
Buddhist Churches of America
Building and Construction Authority, a Singapore government statutory board
Burst Cutting Area
Broadcasting Corporation of Abia State (Radio)
Minnesota Bureau of Criminal Apprehension, a detective agency in Minnesota, United States